Group A of the 2015 CONCACAF Gold Cup was one of three groups competing of nations at the 2015 CONCACAF Gold Cup. The group's matches were played in July. All six group matches were played at venues in the United States. Matches were played at Frisco's Toyota Stadium on July 7, Foxborough's Gillette Stadium on July 10 and Kansas City's Sporting Park on July 13.

Teams

Notes

Standings

In the quarter-finals:
United States advanced to play Cuba (third-placed team of Group C).
Haiti advanced to play Jamaica (winner of Group B).
Panama (as one of the two best third-placed teams) advanced to play Trinidad and Tobago (winner of Group C).

Matches
All times EDT (UTC−4). If the venue is located in a different time zone, the local time is given in parentheses.

Panama vs Haiti

United States vs Honduras

Honduras vs Panama

United States vs Haiti

Haiti vs Honduras

Panama vs United States

References

External links
 

Group A